Cerullo is a surname. Notable people with the surname include:

Alfred C. Cerullo III, American commissioner of New York City Department of Consumer Affairs
Isadora Cerullo (born 1991), American-Brazil rugby player
Leonard J. Cerullo, American neurosurgeon
Morris Cerullo (1931–2020), American Pentecostal televangelist

Fictional characters:
Lois Cerullo, character in the television series General Hospital
Italian-language surnames